Zingerle is a surname. Notable people with the surname include:

Andreas Zingerle (born 1961), Italian biathlete
Franz Zingerle (1908–1988), Austrian alpine skier
Hermann Zingerle (1870–1935), Austrian neurologist and psychiatrist
Ignaz Vincenz Zingerle (1825–1892), Austrian poet and scholar
Pius Zingerle (1801–1881), Austrian Orientalist